Zhang Liting (born 23 August 1994) is a Chinese basketball player for Bayi Kylin and the Chinese national team, where she participated at the 2014 FIBA World Championship.

References

1994 births
Living people
Chinese women's basketball players
Centers (basketball)
Basketball players from Hubei
People from Xiangyang
Bayi Kylin players